The Timoshenko–Ehrenfest beam theory was developed by Stephen Timoshenko and Paul Ehrenfest early in the 20th century. The model takes into account shear deformation and rotational bending effects, making it suitable for describing the behaviour of thick beams, sandwich composite beams, or beams subject to high-frequency excitation when the wavelength approaches the thickness of the beam. The resulting equation is of 4th order but, unlike Euler–Bernoulli beam theory, there is also a second-order partial derivative present. Physically, taking into account the added mechanisms of deformation effectively lowers the stiffness of the beam, while the result is a larger deflection under a static load and lower predicted eigenfrequencies for a given set of boundary conditions. The latter effect is more noticeable for higher frequencies as the wavelength becomes shorter (in principle comparable to the height of the beam or shorter), and thus the distance between opposing shear forces decreases.

Rotary inertia effect was introduced by Bresse and Rayleigh.

If the shear modulus of the beam material approaches infinity—and thus the beam becomes rigid in shear—and if rotational inertia effects are neglected, Timoshenko beam theory converges towards ordinary beam theory.

Quasistatic Timoshenko beam 

In static Timoshenko beam theory without axial effects, the displacements of the beam are assumed to be given by

The governing equations are the following coupled system of ordinary differential equations:

The Timoshenko beam theory for the static case is equivalent to the Euler–Bernoulli theory when the last term above is neglected, an approximation that is valid when

where
  is the length of the beam.
  is the cross section area.
  is the elastic modulus.
  is the shear modulus.
  is the second moment of area.
 , called the Timoshenko shear coefficient, depends on the geometry. Normally,  for a rectangular section.
  is a distributed load (force per length).

Combining the two equations gives, for a homogeneous beam of constant cross-section,

The bending moment  and the shear force  in the beam are related to the displacement  and the rotation .  These relations, for a linear elastic Timoshenko beam, are:

{| class="toccolours collapsible collapsed" width="60%" style="text-align:left"
!Derivation of quasistatic Timoshenko beam equations
|-
|From the kinematic assumptions for a Timoshenko beam, the displacements of the beam are given by

Then, from the strain-displacement relations for small strains, the non-zero strains based on the Timoshenko assumptions are

Since the actual shear strain in the beam is not constant over the cross section we introduce a correction factor  such that

The variation in the internal energy of the beam is

Define

Then

Integration by parts, and noting that because of the boundary conditions the variations are zero at the ends of the beam, leads to

Then, for a quasistatic beam, the principle of virtual work gives

The governing equations for the beam are, from the fundamental theorem of variational calculus,

For a linear elastic beam

Therefore the governing equations for the beam may be expressed as

Combining the two equations together gives

|}

Boundary conditions 
The two equations that describe the deformation of a Timoshenko beam have to be augmented with boundary conditions if they are to be solved.  Four boundary conditions are needed for the problem to be well-posed.  Typical boundary conditions are:
 Simply supported beams: The displacement  is zero at the locations of the two supports.  The bending moment  applied to the beam also has to be specified.  The rotation  and the transverse shear force  are not specified.
 Clamped beams: The displacement  and the rotation  are specified to be zero at the clamped end.  If one end is free, shear force  and bending moment  have to be specified at that end.

Strain energy of a Timoshenko beam  
The strain energy of a Timoshenko beam is expressed as a sum of strain energy due to bending and shear. Both these components are quadratic in their variables. The strain energy function of a Timoshenko beam can be written as,

Example: Cantilever beam 

For a cantilever beam, one boundary is clamped while the other is free. Let us use a right handed coordinate system where the  direction is positive towards right and the  direction is positive upward. We also assume that the sign convention of the stress resultants ( and ) is such that positive bending moments compress the material at the bottom of the beam (lower  coordinates) and positive shear forces rotate the beam in a counterclockwise direction.

If a point load  is applied to the free end in the positive  direction, a free body diagram of the beam gives us

and

Therefore, from the expressions for the bending moment and shear force, we have

The second equation can then be written as

Integration and application of the boundary condition  at  gives

The axial stress is given by

Dynamic Timoshenko beam 
In Timoshenko beam theory without axial effects, the displacements of the beam are assumed to be given by

Starting from the above assumption, the Timoshenko beam theory, allowing for vibrations, may be described with the coupled linear partial differential equations:

Note that unlike the Euler–Bernoulli theory, the angular deflection is another variable and not approximated by the slope of the deflection. Also,
  is the density of the beam material (but not the linear density).
  is the cross section area.
  is the elastic modulus.
  is the shear modulus.
  is the second moment of area.
 , called the Timoshenko shear coefficient, depends on the geometry. Normally,  for a rectangular section.
  is a distributed load (force per length).
 
 

These parameters are not necessarily constants.

For a linear elastic, isotropic, homogeneous beam of constant cross-section these two equations can be combined to give

{| class="toccolours collapsible collapsed" width="60%" style="text-align:left"
!Derivation of combined Timoshenko beam equation
|-
|The equations governing the bending of a homogeneous Timoshenko beam of constant cross-section are

From equation (1), assuming appropriate smoothness, we have

Differentiating equation (2) gives

Substituting equation (3), (4), (5)  into  equation (6) and rearrange, we get

|}
The Timoshenko equation predicts a critical frequency

For normal modes the Timoshenko equation can be solved. Being a fourth order equation, there are four independent solutions, two oscillatory and two evanescent for frequencies below .  
For frequencies larger than  all solutions are oscillatory and, as consequence, a second spectrum appears.

Axial effects 
If the displacements of the beam are given by

where  is an additional displacement in the -direction, then the governing equations of a Timoshenko beam take the form

Any external axial force is balanced by the stress resultant

where  is the axial stress and the thickness of the beam has been assumed to be .

The combined beam equation with axial force effects included is

Damping 
If, in addition to axial forces, we assume a damping force that is proportional to the velocity with the form

the coupled governing equations for a Timoshenko beam take the form

and the combined equation becomes

A caveat to this Ansatz damping force (resembling viscosity) is that, whereas viscosity leads to a frequency-dependent and amplitude-independent damping rate of beam oscillations, the empirically measured damping rates are frequency-insensitive, but depend on the amplitude of beam deflection.

Shear coefficient 
Determining the shear coefficient is not straightforward (nor are the determined values widely accepted, i.e. there's more than one answer); generally it must satisfy:
 .

The shear coefficient depends on Poisson's ratio. The attempts to provide precise expressions were made by many scientists, including Stephen Timoshenko, Raymond D. Mindlin, G. R. Cowper, N. G. Stephen, J. R. Hutchinson etc. (see also the derivation of the Timoshenko beam theory as a refined beam theory based on the variational-asymptotic method in the book by Khanh C. Le leading to different shear coefficients in the static and dynamic cases). In engineering practice, the expressions by Stephen Timoshenko are sufficient in most cases. In 1975 Kaneko published an excellent review of studies of the shear coefficient. More recently new experimental data show that the shear coefficient is underestimated.

Corrective shear coefficients for homogeneous isotropic beam according to Cowper - selection.

where  is Poisson's ratio.

See also
 Plate theory
 Sandwich theory

References

Continuum mechanics
Structural analysis